Three Preludes is a ballet by Mark Morris to eponymous music by George Gershwin for his own company and presented as a piece d'occasion by the New York City Ballet.  The performance took place June 16, 1992, at the New York State Theater, Lincoln Center and featured Mikhail Baryshnikov.

References 

Ballets by Mark Morris
New York City Ballet repertory
1992 ballet premieres
Ballets to the music of George Gershwin